Lanka Tribune is a fortnightly free  community  newspaper published for  Sri Lankans in the United Kingdom. The newspaper was launched in the UK in 2007 in compact size.

The newspaper is edited by Rasantha Cooray and published in  Harrow,  Middlesex. Lanka Tribune is registered as a newspaper in the UK and distributed in - London, Birmingham, Manchester, Leicester, Dublin, Glasgow, Colombo, Frankfurt, Paris and Rome.

The paper provides both community news for British Sri Lankans and news from the island of  Sri Lanka.

 Source: Lanka Tribune Official Website

See also
Media in Sri Lanka
List of newspapers in Sri Lanka
List of newspapers in the United Kingdom
Sri Lanka

Current columnists and journalists

Rasantha Cooray
Andrew McLean
Ivan Corea
Sydney Reynolds
Munza Mushtaq
Keerthi Senanayake
Suren Ladd
Anand Vamadeva
Risidra Mendis
Sanjeevani Seneviratne
Shyana Mushin
Santhush Fernando
Durga Ramachandran
Amali De Alwis
Sidanthi Siriwardena
Anarkalee Robert
Vickum Mahanama

External links
  Lanka Tribune Official Website

Newspapers published in London
2007 establishments in England